Jennie: Lady Randolph Churchill is a British television period serial made by Thames Television and broadcast in 1974. It stars Lee Remick in the title role of Jennie Jerome, who became Lady Randolph Churchill. The series covers the time period from 1873 to 1921. In the United States, the series was aired as part of PBS' Great Performances.

The series was nominated for six Primetime Emmy Awards at the 28th Primetime Emmy Awards, including the Primetime Emmy Award for Outstanding Limited Series, and four BAFTA TV Awards. Remick was nominated for an Emmy for her portrayal of Jennie Jerome and won both Golden Globe and BAFTA awards.

Cast
Lee Remick as Jennie Jerome
Ronald Pickup as Lord Randolph Churchill 
Warren Clarke as Winston Churchill
Cyril Luckham as Duke of Marlborough
Jeremy Brett as Count Karel Kinsky
Christopher Cazenove as George Cornwallis-West
Joanna David as Princess Alexandra
Thorley Walters as Edward, Prince of Wales
Siân Phillips as Mrs. Patrick Campbell
Zoë Wanamaker as John Oliver Hobbes
Anna Fox as Clementine Churchill
Rachel Kempson as Duchess of Marlborough
Barbara Parkins as Leonie Jerome
Dan O'Herlihy as Leonard Jerome
Malcolm Stoddard as Jack Churchill
Charles Kay as Montagu Phippen Porch
Patrick Troughton as Benjamin Disraeli

Episodes

References

External links

Period television series
1974 British television series debuts
1974 British television series endings
1970s British drama television series
English-language television shows
Cultural depictions of Edward VII
Cultural depictions of Winston Churchill
Television series set in the 1870s
Television series set in the 1880s
Television series set in the 1890s
Television series set in the 1900s
Television series set in the 1910s
Television series set in the 1920s
Television shows shot at Teddington Studios